Shepiran Rural District is in Kuhsar District of Salmas County, West Azerbaijan province, Iran. At the National Census of 2006, its population was 10,052 in 1,625 households. There were 8,517 inhabitants in 1,584 households at the following census of 2011. At the most recent census of 2016, the population of the rural district was 8,550 in 1,747 households. The largest of its 21 villages was Delazi, with 2,039 people.

References 

Salmas County

Rural Districts of West Azerbaijan Province

Populated places in West Azerbaijan Province

Populated places in Salmas County